Released in October 2005 by Wizards of the Coast, the Xiaolin Showdown Trading Card Game is an out-of-print collectible card game based on the Xiaolin Showdown animated series. It is a two player game where the object is to be the first to win four contests for Shen Gong Wu. The Shen Gong Wu are hidden mystical objects, and searching for them and using them is a central focus of the series, with conflicts over their possession resolved by a Xiaolin Showdown. The first expansion set, Wudai Warriors, was released in March 2006.

Gameplay
There are four types of cards (Warrior, Shen Gong Wu, Master, and Villain) and four elements (Earth, Fire, Wind, and Water) which are associated with the four Xiaolin monks and the color of the non-Villain cards. During the game, each player has a deck, a hand, a Warrior Training Area, a Vault, and a discard pile which cards will move between according to rules. There is also a Showdown Arena that is used by both players when they wish to start a Xiaolin Showdown. In addition to winning by being the first to win four Shen Gong Wu in a Showdown, it is possible to lose by running out of cards in one's deck and then being required to draw

Card types
The type of card dictates how it can be played. Each card has a skill number in a circle and a power number in a hexagon. The lower the skill number, the easier it is to bring the card into play. The higher the power number, the more powerful the card will be when used in a Xiaolin Showdown for a Shen Gong Wu.

Warrior
Each turn, a player may play one Warrior card to his Training Area. Such cards are played face up and upside down, so that Warrior icon on the card is right side up. The skill and power numbers of a Warrior card in the Training Area do not matter. However, the number of cards in the Training Area determines one's skill level, which is also important. During a showdown, a Warrior card may be used as a Boost card, and any special ability the card has applies only then.

These cards are named after various martial arts moves that are used in the series as well as a number of additional moves with similar names, but which have not been used so far. This includes cards for the signature moves for the Xiaolin monks as both Xiaolin apprentices and Wudai warriors in the second and third season of the series. The Xiaolin apprentice move cards are "Rare" cards and the Wudai Warrior move cards are "Premium" cards.

Shen Gong Wu
Each turn, a player may play one Shen Gong Wu card. Such cards may either be played directly to one's Vault or be made the subject of a Xiaolin Showdown. A Shen Gong Wu card may be played directly to one's Vault only if you have a number of Warriors equal to or more than the skill number of the Shen Gong Wu. This does not count as victory in a Xiaolin Showdown, but does enable the player to tap the card in future Showdowns. If a player has no Shen Gong Wu in his hand, or does not wish to play one that is hand, he may choose to flip over the top card in his deck. If the card is a Shen Gong Wu, then there will be a Showdown for it. If it is not a Shen Gong Wu, it goes to the discard pile. During a showdown, a Shen Gong Wu card in a player's hand may be used as a Boost card. Shen Gong Wu that are in a player's vault may also be used, and any special ability that the Shen Gong Wu has applies only when the card is tapped.

Not all of the Shen Gong Wu that have been featured on the show have cards in the game and some of the Shen Gong Wu in the game had not been featured on the show as of the game's launch. The game debuted during the show's third season and the promotional material for the game indicated that they would be used in future episodes, thus making purchasing the game a way for fans of the series to learn about the Shen Gong Wu before they were used on the show. Some of the Shen Gong Wu cards in the game are labeled with a second descriptor such as Animal, Armor, Clothing, Weapon, Jewel, or Trinket. Such descriptors have no effect on gameplay under the current version of the rules, but may have some effect either on tournament rules or with a future expansion set.

Master
Master cards are treated as if they were Warrior cards, except for three differences:
 The special ability that the card has applies when the card is in the training area, but not when used as a Boost card.
 Because of this reversal of when the special ability is used, the warrior icon and the power and skill numbers are placed upside down from where they are found on a Warrior card and the card is played right side up in the Training Area instead of upside down.
 You must have a number of Warrior cards of the same color already in your Training Area to play a Master card in your training area.

Villain
Villain cards are used in place of Boost cards during a Xiaolin Showdown, and at no other time during the game. Villain cards are distinctive in that they have Gray color and they have four separate power numbers. The power number that is used depends upon the color of the Shen Gong Wu that is the object of the Showdown. Villain cards are only effective when played by the defending player, and if more than one Villain Card is played, they do not work together.

Elements
There are four elements, each of which is associated with a monk, and with the color scheme of the card.
 Earth, Yellow, Clay
 Fire, Red, Kimiko
 Water, Dark Blue, Omi
 Wind, Light Blue, Raimundo

Xiaolin Showdown
A Xiaolin Showdown begins when an attacking player chooses to put a Shen Gong Wu in the Showdown Arena.

Each player may tap, similar to the system used in Magic: The Gathering, Shen Gong Wu that are in his Vault up to the point where the sum of the skill numbers of the tapped cards equals the number of Warriors in his Training Area. At least one of the Warriors in his training area must be the same color as the Shen Gong Wu in order for the Shen Gong Wu to be tapped. Any special ability that the Shen Gong Wu has can only be applied when the card is tapped. Only Shen Gong Wu cards can be tapped in this game.

After both players have decided whether to tap any Shen Gong Wu, each player may choose to play one card face down from his hand or from his deck. If the card played has a skill number that exceeds the number of Warriors in the player's Training Area, it has no effect. If the card is anything other than a Villain card, it is a Boost card. A Boost card adds its Power to the Power of the Shen Gong Wu that have been tapped to give the Power number of the player, but only if the player has a Warrior card in his Training Area that is the same color. If a Boost card has a special ability that applies during a Showdown it is also applied.

A Villain card played by the player who started the showdown has no effect. A Villain card played by the defending player has a Power number for that color Shen Gong Wu, and the attacking player must defeat both the defender and the Villain to win the Showdown. If a player uses a special ability that works upon winning a showdown, he must also beat any Villains in play for the ability to work.

Sometimes a special ability will allow a player to Press a card. If a player Presses a card, he may play a card from the deck as a second card that will act as a Boost or Villain card.

Ties in Showdowns are won first by Villains and then by the defending player. If the attacking player wins, the Shen Gong Wu goes into his Vault as an untapped card, and he has achieved one of the four victories needed to win the game. If he does not win, the Shen Gong Wu goes into his discard pile. Any Boost or Villain cards used during the Showdown go into that player's discard pile. Any Shen Gong Wu that were tapped remain tapped until either the start of that player's next turn or untapped by a special ability.

Credits
The game was designed by Mike Elliott. The images on the cards are taken from the animated series the game is based upon.

Products
Each starter set contains two 41-card decks with cards that are of the same element and include one premium card in each deck. The starter set also includes a playmat and a showdown victory encounter intended to be used to help players learn the game, as well as a rulebook and a list of available cards. Booster packs contain 10 game cards and an eleventh card that contains one of four checklists on the front and one of a variety of ads for the game's website on the back. Cards are at one of four rarity levels, Common, Uncommon, Rare, and Premium. Premium cards are stated to be approximately one out of every 30. The first release includes 135 different cards, 27 of which are premium cards.
 Xiaolin Showdown Two-Player Starter Set  (MSRP: US$9.99)
 Xiaolin Showdown 10-Card Booster Pack  (MSRP: US$3.69)
 Wudai Warriors 10-Card Booster Pack (MSRP: US$3.69)

External links
 

Card games introduced in 2005
Collectible card games
Trading Card Game
Wizards of the Coast games